The Singapore Sepaktakraw Federation (abbreviated PERSES), is the national governing body for sepaktakraw in Singapore, founded in 1959 at Istana Kampong Glam, and was recognized as one of the community associations on 1999 by the government People's Association. The roles of the PERSES include organising the domestic competitions; the Premier League and the National League, which was established in 1991, promote and develop Sepaktakraw, locally and internationally, establish a long-term athlete development plan and develop a national curriculum for sepaktakraw, as well as a selection of players for the international competitions. In 2021, the PERSES also created the first female Sepaktakraw national team to compete at 2021 Southeast Asian Games in Vietnam.

History
The federation was officially registered as the national governing body for sepaktakraw in Singapore on 15 June 1960 at Istana Kampong Glam, Sultan Gate, after the list of proposed office bearers was sent to the Registrar of Societies (SOS) of Singapore on October 1959, the proposal was approved under the registered document no. 179/59, with Mohd Amin Bin Haji Jamil, who was the acting assistant Commissioner of Police at that moment, served as the first president of the federation. Since its inception, building no. 286 on Jalan Eunos was registered as the federation office, until 1986 it was moved to no. 1 Jalan Pasar Baru in Geylang Serai, and again to the Bedok Centre of Excellence in 2002-2018. Currently, the PERSES head office is stationed at the Heartbeat Bedok Sports Hall.

The Singapore Sepaktakraw Federation was categorized as one of the Singaporean social organizations under the People's Association Act (PA Act) on 18 March 1999, together with the Singapore Silat Federation (Persekutuan Silat Singapura; PERSIS), making sepaktakraw becomes the traditional tournament in many sports activities of the association.

National championship
The Singapore Sepaktakraw Federation established two national championships in 1991 namely; the Premier League and the National League, in which each affiliated domestic club has been participating annually for the title. As of 2021, twenty-one Sepaktakraw clubs in total are affiliated with the PERSES.

Board of directors
The lists below are the current board of directors of the Sepaktakraw Association of Indonesia, as well as the former ones. A former president of the PERSES, Abdul Halim Kader, was also elected by the 2021 Asian Sepaktakraw Federation congress election to take a seat as its president for the term 2021 to 2025 after he expired from the term of office in PERSES by completing its four-year term.
 President: Mohd Nasri Bin Haron (since 2021)
 Secretary General: Zahid Bin Abdul Aziz (since 2021)

References

External links
 

Sports governing bodies in Singapore
Sepak takraw governing bodies